Saki Naka is a neighbourhood in Andheri east, Mumbai.

Transport
The city's first elevated metro line, Mumbai Metro's line one passes through this neighbourhood and has a station to the east of Sakinaka junction.

See also
 Saki Naka metro station

References

Neighbourhoods in Mumbai
Andheri